Synodontis nummifer, known as the two spot synodontis, is a species of upside-down catfish native to the Congo Basin of Cameroon, the Democratic Republic of the Congo and the Republic of the Congo.  It was first described by the Belgian-British zoologist George Albert Boulenger in 1899, based upon a holotype discovered in Léopoldville, Belgian Congo.  The specific name "nummifer" comes from the Latin for "to bear a coin", which refers to the large spots on its sides.

Description 
The body of the fish is olive colored on the back transitioning to whitish on the underside.   The sides of the fish have a large round black spot on each side, above the lateral line, and frequently a second spot above the base of the anal fin.  The pigmentation of the head is spotted.

Like other members of the genus, this fish has a humeral process, which is a bony spike that is attached to a hardened head cap on the fish and can be seen extending beyond the gill opening.  This process is broad and rounded at the end, and extends as far as the occipito-nuchal process. The first ray of the dorsal fin and the pectoral fins have a hardened first ray which is serrated, as long or a little longer than the head.   The caudal fin is very deeply forked.   It has short, cone-shaped teeth in the upper jaw. In the lower jaw, the teeth are s-shaped and movable.  The fish has one pair of maxillary barbels, with broad membranes at the base, as long as the head or slightly shorter, and two pairs of mandibular barbels that are often branched.  The adipose fin is about four times as long as it is deep.  The pectoral spine is a little shorter than the head, and strongly serrated on both sides.

This species grows to a length of  SL although specimens up to  TL have been recorded in the wild.

Habitat
It has been found throughout the Congo River basin, but not the southern tributaries of the Congo River.

Parasites
As other fish, Synodontis nummifer harbours parasites, including species of the monogenean genus Synodontella.

References

External links

nummifer
Freshwater fish of Africa
Fish of Cameroon
Fish of the Democratic Republic of the Congo
Fish of the Republic of the Congo
Taxa named by George Albert Boulenger
Fish described in 1899